Hajji Hossein-Gholi Khan Noori (1849–1937), also known as Hajji Washington, was an Iranian politician, cabinet minister, and diplomat and belonged to one of the oldest aristocratic families in Persia - the Khadjenouris, tracing their history back to over one thousand years.

Early life and education 
Hajji Hossain-Gholi Khan was the second son of the Persian vizier/prime minister, Mirza Agha Khan Nouri. He was educated by his father. He then entered the service of the Ministry of finance, and later the ministry of foreign affairs.

Political career 
He was appointed the first ambassador to the United States in 1889, where he kept a scrapbook of newspaper cuttings from the American press about the reigning monarch Nasir-ad-din Shah.  He objected to how the Shah’s official visit to England in 1889 was covered by the press and he resigned from his post in protest. After his return from the United States, he served as the minister of public works ("favaayed-e aamme") and married Nasir-ad-din Shah’s daughter.

Diplomatic career 
Haji Hossain-Gholi Khan was the Persian Consul General to India. In 1885, when the Democratic Party took over the administration, Benjamin, the first US ambassador in Iran, resigned his post conforming with diplomatic practice. On November 20, 1885, President Cleveland appointed Fredrick H. Winston as Benjamin's successor. On August 3, 1886, Spencer Pratt was appointed as the third US Consul General in Tehran. At this time, Nasereddin Shah decided to open a permanent Iranian embassy in Washington. Haji Hossain-Gholi Khan was appointed as Minister Plenipotentiary and Envoy Extraordinary to Washington 

He selected his staff of ten of the English-speaking members of the Iranian Foreign Ministry.  It took him and his staff 2 months and a very difficult journey to arrive in Washington. He had a friendly attitude and a sociable nature. His reports were positive and illuminating. He managed to spark interest in Iran among American orientalogists.

Later years 
He returned to live in Tehran after his mission to the US.
 Haji Washington had one son named Nasrullah and two daughters named Mehr Mah and Taj al Molook who married Hossein Ghods-Nakhai, the Iranian minister of foreign affairs and ambassador to Washington in Pahlavi era.

See also
Hajji Washington, a fictitious film based on the story of the same politician.

Notes

References
'Alí Rizā Awsatí (عليرضا اوسطى), Iran in the Past Three Centuries (Irān dar Se Qarn-e Goz̲ashteh - ايران در سه قرن گذشته), Volumes 1 and 2 (Paktāb Publishing - انتشارات پاکتاب, Tehran, Iran, 2003).  (Vol. 1),  (Vol. 2).

Government ministers of Iran
Iranian governors
1849 births
1937 deaths
Ambassadors of Iran to Germany
Ambassadors of Iran to France
Ambassadors of Iran to the United States
Ambassadors of Iran to Japan
Ambassadors of Iran to Afghanistan
People from Nur, Iran